Nedytisis obrioides is a species of beetle in the family Cerambycidae. It was described by Francis Polkinghorne Pascoe in 1866. It is known from Malaysia and Borneo.

References

Saperdini
Beetles described in 1866